"Frank's Tribute" is the 16th episode of the third season of the American sitcom Everybody Loves Raymond (1996–2005). The episode aired on February 8, 1999 on CBS. It was written by Eric Cohen and directed by Will Mackenzie.

Reception 
Upon its airing, "Frank's Tribute" received a mixed review from Virginia Rohan of The Record, who criticized the dramatic tonal shift in its second act and found it "well-acted, but wrenchingly unfunny" overall. However, the episode has been more well-received in later years. It landed in a 2002 unranked list of the top ten best Everybody Loves Raymond episodes by The Star-Ledger, which claimed it had the "funniest" and "most poignant" sequences of the entire show. It was also claimed the second funniest episode of the series by Screen Rant, which highlighted Ray and Robert's tribute video. As of December 2019, it is the ninth-highest Raymond episode primarily about Frank on IMDb, with a rating of 7.8/10. DVDTalk, in a review of season three of the show, called both "Frank's Tribute" and "Cruising with Marie" "pretty funny and put the characters at the center of some great situations." For writing "Frank's Tribute," Cohen was nominated for a Humanitas Prize in the 30-minute show. Roberts was also nominated for a Primetime Emmy Award for Outstanding Supporting Actress in a Comedy Series for acting in "Frank's Tribute" and "The Toaster."

Home media 
On May 3, 2005, all of the third season of Everybody Loves Raymond was released to DVD, including "Frank's Tribute." The episode was also released to Amazon Prime on November 8, 2013 alongside the other season three episodes. It, along with the whole series, was available on Netflix until September 1, 2016.

References 

1999 American television episodes
Everybody Loves Raymond episodes